Wanderson Gustavo da Silva, known as Wanderson Cafu or just Cafu (born 18 March 1986) is a Brazilian footballer who plays for Campinense.

Biography
Born in José Bonifácio, São Paulo, Cafu started his professional career for Figueirense. In July 2006 he was signed by Sport Club Brusquense in 1-year contract, which played in 2006 Divisão de Acesso of Santa Catarina state championship.

In February 2007 he was signed by Mirassol in 2-year contract. After the end of 2007 second division of São Paulo state championship, he was signed by Brazilian second division team Remo, as understudy of Lucas Silva. In September he left for São Caetano in 3-year deal. In January he left for Americano and in June for Noroeste of Brazilian third division. In February 2009 he was signed by Rio Preto of São Paulo second division and in June signed by Francana in 1-year contract. After played in 2009 Copa Paulista de Futebol, he was signed by Ferroviária for São Paulo third division in January 2010. In June he was signed by Campinense until the end of 2009 Brazilian third division, which the team did not qualify to the second stage. Cafu himself left for América de Natal in September, which the team relegated from 2010 Brazilian second division.

In January 2011 he was signed by Grêmio Barueri. After the end of São Paulo state championship, he was signed by ICASA in May.

On 3 August 2011 he was signed by Campinense.

References

External links
 
 

Brazilian footballers
Figueirense FC players
Mirassol Futebol Clube players
Clube do Remo players
Associação Desportiva São Caetano players
Americano Futebol Clube players
Rio Preto Esporte Clube players
Associação Atlética Francana players
Associação Ferroviária de Esportes players
Campinense Clube players
América Futebol Clube (RN) players
Grêmio Barueri Futebol players
Associação Desportiva Recreativa e Cultural Icasa players
Association football fullbacks
Footballers from São Paulo (state)
1986 births
Living people